Street Angel is an alternative comic book limited series by Jim Rugg and Brian Maruca. It was published in 2004 by Slave Labor Graphics, and lasted five issues. In 2016 Jim Rugg would start posting new and old street angel comics online as webcomics, both to his personal website and the Tapas syndicate. Five graphic novels and a one shot were later released by Image Comics between 2017 and 2018, two of them being re-releases of web comics. These books were printed at a larger scale than the original issues, hard cover and full color. They were collected as a single trade paperback in 2019.

Plot
The story takes place in Wilkesborough, the worst ghetto in Angel City.  The title character is 12-year-old Jesse Sanchez (13-year-old after a bout of time travel), "a dangerous martial artist... and the world's greatest homeless skateboarder."  She handles ninjas, pirates and hunger with skill, aplomb, and help from her friends. Street Angel is an unironic alternative take on comics, mixing a variety of styles, inspirations and genres to "bring the fantastical to the mundane".  None of the comics share any continuity.

Bibliography
 Street Angel #1–5
 Comics Festival, a one-shot published by the Toronto Comic Arts Festival for Free Comic Book Day, 2005
 Street Angel: After School Kung Fu Special (Image Comics, hard cover, 2017)
 Ghost Monster (Self published online, 2016)
 Xmas Special (Self published online, 2016)
 The Street Angel Gang (Image Comics, hard cover, 2017)
 Street Angel: Superhero For A Day (Image Comics, hard cover, 2017)
 Street Angel Goes To Juvie (Image Comics, hard cover, 2018)
 Street Angel's Dog (Image Comics, a one-shot for Free Comic Book Day, 2018)
 Street Angel Vs Ninjatech (Image Comics, hard cover, 2018)

Collected editions
Street Angel (Slave Labor Graphics, trade paperback collecting limited series, FCBD story, 208 pages, July 2005)
 Street Angel: Princess of Poverty (AdHouse Books, hard cover collecting all Street Angel comics made prior to 2015, 2015)
 Street Angel: Deadliest Girl Alive (Image Comics, trade paperback collecting the hard cover books, Street Angel's Dog, Ghost Monster and Xmas Special, 240 pages, 2019)

In other media
A Street Angel live-action short film was produced in 2008, starring Kate Bell as Jesse.  It is written and directed by Lucas Testro and produced by Adam Bishop, adapting Issue 1 of the comic series.  The film also incorporates elements from Issue 4 of the series.  Street Angel co-creator Jim Rugg contributed original artwork that is used in the film's opening animated sequence.

References

External links

 
 
 Street Angel at Tapas

Tapastic webcomics
Image Comics titles
Comic book limited series
2004 comics debuts
2017 comics debuts
2005 comics endings
2019 comics endings
Webtoons